Dr Sandra Marie Palmer (born on the 4th of August 1969) is a Jamaican entrepreneur who founded an information technology company, SSP APTEC in 1997, opening a branch in Fort Lauderdale, Florida in 2002. In 2014, she founded Soulmates, a boutique match-making social club, and Peak Performance International, a consulting firm.

From 2006 to 2018, she lectured on New Ventures and Entrepreneurship at the Mona School of Business and Management at the University of the West Indies, Mona, and Managerial Economics and New Venture Creation at Northern Caribbean University. In 2010, the World Bank named her as one of the top female entrepreneurs in Latin America and the Caribbean.

On August 2nd, 2016, she was appointed CEO and Senior Partner at Above or Beyond (formerly The Job Bank). The new organisation plans to establish its past legacy in the area of human capital development by strengthening its internal capacity and expanding its reach in the Caribbean and Florida.

Early life and education
Dr Sandra Palmer was born in the small, rural community of Topsham, located in Manchester, Jamaica. She has two younger brothers. She attended Coley's Mountain Primary School from 1974 to 1980. Upon failing her first attempt at the Common Entrance Examination, she was sent to Nazareth All Age School in 1980 where she was successful in her second attempt at the Common Entrance Examination moving on to Bishop Gibson High School for Girls in Mandeville in 1981. She graduated from Bishop Gibson in 1986.

After spending time briefly in the banking sector, she began pursuing tertiary education in 1989 at the University of the West Indies, Mona. She graduated with a Bachelor of Arts Honours degree, majoring in History, Political Science and Economics.

In 1997, she earned her Master of Business Administration (with Distinction) from Nova Southeastern University at the H. Wayne Huizenga School of Business and Entrepreneurship, where she specialized in General Management. In 2004, she completed her doctorate in Business Administration with honours from Nova Southeastern University’s H. Wayne Huizenga School of Business and Entrepreneurship where she specialized in Information Technology Management. Her doctoral dissertation entitled "A Study of the Inclination of Jamaican Employees to Opt for Telework: A Comparison with Findings for United Kingdom Employees" was published in 2004.

Career
Dr Palmer worked at the National Commercial Bank for four years until she resigned in 1990 to focus completely on her university education. After completing her first degree, she began working at the information technology firm WTG-APTEC. In 1996, she left  and joined GraceKennedy’s InfoGrace team as corporate account executive.

In October 1997, Dr Palmer started SSP APTEC Limited in Kingston, Jamaica, an information technology company providing audio-visual equipment. The firm also advised the top management of small and medium-sized enterprises (SMEs) and institutions on issues of strategy, organizational operations and technology. In November 2002, she expanded to Florida under the name SSP APTEC Inc. and remained in that market for 10 years. In March 2012, after almost two decades, she suspended both companies and went into academia full-time.

Dr Palmer was acknowledged in the World Bank report "Women's Economic Opportunities in the Formal Private Sector in Latin America and the Caribbean: A focus on Entrepreneurship in 2010 for her entrepreneurial pursuits and was cited as one of Jamaica's most successful female entrepreneurs".

In 2014, she founded two companies: Peak Performance International, which offers executive coaching, business and life coaching, motivational and keynote speaking as well as management consulting; and Soulmates, an exclusive match-making site, which finds love for the affluent and successful individual who is seeking a meaningful long-term relationship. As a core philosophy, Palmer believes that "only the companies who rethink their strategies and put plans in place to respond to the new business environment will remain viable or even survive."

In August 2017, Dr Palmer became CEO and Senior Partner at Above or Beyond (formerly The JobBank), the corporate brand of Leahcim T. Semaj and Company Limited. Her role is to leverage her experience in business and academia to lead the organisation.

As a serial entrepreneur, Dr Palmer has created and led successful businesses over the last two decades in Information Technology, Trucking, Coatings and Luxury Services. She has created a distinct personal brand that makes a real difference in the lives of individuals and organizations she touches.

Lecturing 

Dr Palmer began her career in education at Jamaica College as a teacher of Caribbean History. She left after one semester but returned to education in 2006 when she became a lecturer at the University of the West Indies, Mona, School of Business and Management and also at Northern Caribbean University, College of Business and Hospitality Management.
At the Mona School of Business and Management at the University of the West Indies], Palmer redesigned the New Ventures and Entrepreneurship course, in the MBA, MBM, and EMBA programs at the University. At Northern Caribbean University, she teaches Business Writing, Entrepreneurship and New Venture Initiatives, and Managerial Economics in the MBA program. She also lectured Entrepreneurship at the University of Technology in Jamaica from 2007 to 2014. From 2012 to 2014, she served as Dean of Undergraduate Studies at the University College of the Caribbean and also as the Director of Information Services.

Author
Dr Palmer's auto-biography is On Seraph Wings: Memoirs of a Country Girl.

References

Jamaican educators
Jamaican business executives
1969 births
Living people
Consultants